Polly Feigl is an American biostatistician known for her work on survival distributions of patients with varying exponentially distributed survival rates, and on clinical trials for cancer. She is a professor emerita of biostatistics at the University of Washington.

Education and career
Feigl majored in mathematics at the University of Chicago, and has a master's degree and Ph.D. in statistics from the University of Minnesota.

Book
Feigl is the coauthor, with Johannes Ipsen, of Bancroft's Introduction to Biostatistics (2nd edition, Harper and Row, 1971), a revised edition of a widely used 1957 textbook by Huldah Bancroft.

Recognition
Fiegl was named a Fellow of the American Statistical Association in 1979.

References

Year of birth missing (living people)
Living people
American statisticians
Women statisticians
University of Chicago alumni
University of Minnesota College of Liberal Arts alumni
University of Washington faculty